Hugo Nys and Tim Pütz were the defending champions but only Nys chose to defend his title, partnering Elliot Benchetrit. Nys lost in the first round to Salvatore Caruso and Kenny de Schepper.

Dustin Brown and Donald Young won the title after defeating André Göransson and Sem Verbeek 7–5, 6–4 in the final.

Seeds

Draw

References
 Main draw

BNP Paribas de Nouvelle-Calédonie - Doubles
2019 Doubles